The pale-faced bulbul (Pycnonotus leucops) is a songbird in the bulbul family. It is endemic to the island of Borneo.

Description
At 17.5–19 cm long the pale-faced bulbul is smaller than the flavescent bulbul, with which it was once lumped, which reach 21.5–22 cm in length. Its colouring is mainly brown or grey-brown, darker above than below, with a white or whitish face and throat, and bright yellow undertail-coverts.

Distribution and habitat
The bulbul is found in the mountains of Borneo in montane primary forest, ranging in altitude from about 900 m to 3500 m above sea level.

References

pale-faced bulbul
Endemic birds of Borneo
pale-faced bulbul